Andrew Payne may refer to:
 Andrew Payne (cricketer)
 Andrew Payne (judoka)
 Jap Payne (Andrew H. Payne), baseball player in the Negro leagues
 Andy Payne, American ultramarathon runner